Yevgeny Milevsky (born 14 January 1995) is a Belarusian professional footballer who plays for Lokomotiv Gomel.

External links
 
 
 Profile at Gomel website

1995 births
Living people
Belarusian footballers
Belarus under-21 international footballers
Association football midfielders
Belarusian Premier League players
FC Gomel players
FC UAS Zhitkovichi players
FC Volna Pinsk players
FC Lokomotiv Gomel players